Rhododendron species are used as food plants by the larvae of some species of the order Lepidoptera, including:

 Coleophoridae
 Several Coleophora case-bearer species:
 C. ledi
 C. multicristatella - recorded on R. canadense
 C. vacciniella - recorded on R. hirsutum
 Geometridae
 Engrailed (Ectropis crepuscularia)
 Mottled beauty (Alcis repandata)
 Scalloped hazel (Odontopera bidentata)
 Winter moth (Operophtera brumata)
 Lymantriidae
 Gypsy moth (Lymantria dispar) - only as a food plant of last resort during outbreak conditions
 Noctuidae
 Copper underwing (Amphipyra pyramidea)
 Dun-bar (Cosmia trapezina)
 Gothic (Naenia typica)
 Svensson's copper underwing (Amphipyra berbera)
Saturniidae
Actias selene
Attacus atlas

External links

Rhododendron
+Lepidoptera